Caroline Maitland (1858–1920) was an English poet and writer. She worked under the name "Dollie Radford" after she married Ernest Radford.

Life
Maitland was born in 1858 and in 1880 she met her future husband in the British Museum Reading Room and they continued to meet at Karl Marx's house. She married Ernest Radford in 1883, and wrote as Dollie Radford. They had three children, one being  the doctor and writer Maitland Radford. Her grandchildren include the town and park planner Ann MacEwen.

Her friends included her sister in law Ada Wallas and the socialist Eleanor Marx, whom she knew through a Shakespeare reading group attended by Karl Marx, and Amy Levy. Her papers are housed at the William Andrews Clark Memorial Library at UCLA and at the British Library. Many of the British Library manuscripts have been digitized and can be viewed at Europeana.

Her husband was a member of the Rhymers' Club, but Maitland could not join because of sexual discrimination.

Works
A Light Load (1891)
Songs for Somebody (1893)
Good Night (1895)
Songs and Other Verses (1895)
One Way of Love: an Idyll (1898)
The Poet’s Larder and Other Stories (1904)
The Young Gardeners’ Kalendar (1904)
Sea-Thrift (1904)
In Summer Time (1905)
Shadow-Rabbit, with Gertrude M. Bradley (1906)
A Ballad of Victory and other poems (1907)
Poems (1910)

References

Further reading

External links

Works at The Victorian Women Writers Project
 
 
 
 Dollie Radford manuscripts at Europeana Collections, with 12 catalogue records

1858 births
1920 deaths
19th-century English poets
19th-century English women writers
20th-century English poets
20th-century English women writers
English women poets
Victorian women writers
Pseudonymous women writers
19th-century pseudonymous writers
20th-century pseudonymous writers